Litomiris is a genus of plant bugs in the family Miridae. There are at least three described species in Litomiris.

Species
These three species belong to the genus Litomiris:
 Litomiris curtus (Knight, 1928) i c g b
 Litomiris debilis (Uhler, 1871) i c b
 Litomiris gracilis (Van Duzee, 1914) i c g
Data sources: i = ITIS, c = Catalogue of Life, g = GBIF, b = Bugguide.net

References

Further reading

 
 
 
 
 
 
 

Miridae genera
Stenodemini